Blandouet-Saint Jean is a commune in the department of Mayenne, western France. The municipality was established on 1 January 2017 by merger of the former communes of Saint-Jean-sur-Erve (the seat) and Blandouet.

See also 
Communes of the Mayenne department

References 

Communes of Mayenne